Propebela assimilis is a species of sea snail, a marine gastropod mollusk in the family Mangeliidae.

Description
The length of the shell varies between 7 mm and 25 mm.

Distribution
This marine species occurs in the Sea of Japan; off the Lofotens and Arctic Norway

References

 Gofas, S.; Le Renard, J.; Bouchet, P. (2001). Mollusca. in: Costello, M.J. et al. (eds), European Register of Marine Species: a check-list of the marine species in Europe and a bibliography of guides to their identification. Patrimoines Naturels. 50: 180–213
 Bogdanov I. (1990). Mollusks of Oenopotinae Subfamily (Gastropoda, Pectinibranchia, Turridae) in the seas of the USSR. Leningrad 221 p

External links
  Sars, G.O. (1878). Bidrag til Kundskaben om Norges arktiske Fauna. I. Mollusca Regionis Arcticae Norvegiae. Oversigt over de i Norges arktiske Region Forekommende Bløddyr. Brøgger, Christiania. xiii + 466 pp., pls 1–34 & I-XVIII
 Nekhaev, Ivan O. "Marine shell-bearing Gastropoda of Murman (Barents Sea): an annotated check-list." Ruthenica 24.2 (2014): 75

assimilis
Gastropods described in 1878